Pseudomalachite is a phosphate of copper with hydroxyl, named from the Greek for “false” and “malachite”, because of its similarity in appearance to the carbonate mineral malachite, Cu2(CO3)(OH)2. Both are green coloured secondary minerals found in oxidised zones of copper deposits, often associated with each other.  Pseudomalachite is polymorphous with reichenbachite and ludjibaite. It was discovered in 1813.
Prior to 1950 it was thought that dihydrite, lunnite, ehlite, tagilite and prasin were separate mineral species, but Berry analysed specimens labelled with these names from several museums, and found that they were in fact pseudomalachite.  The old names are no longer recognised by the IMA.

Type locality 
The type locality is the Virneberg Mine, Rheinbreitbach, Westerwald, Rhineland-Palatinate, Germany.  This is an area of ancient copper mining dating back to Roman times, and worked intermittently up until 1872.  The type material is held at the Mining Academy, Freiberg, Germany.

Structure 
The copper ions are co-ordinated by six oxygen ions to form distorted octahedra.  These octahedra are linked by sharing edges to form two distinct types of infinite chains, parallel to b.  The chains are linked alternately, again by sharing octahedral edges, to form sheets parallel to the bc plane.  Distorted phosphate tetrahedra link the sheets, and there is some doubt about the exact position of the hydrogen ions in the structure.

Environment 
It is a secondary mineral found in the oxidised zones of copper ore deposits.  Associated with libethenite at several localities in New South Wales, Australia, and at the Chino Mine, New Mexico, US.  Other associated minerals are apatite, azurite, chalcedony, chrysocolla, cornetite, cuprite, malachite, pyromorphite, tenorite, and iron oxyhydroxides.

Distribution 

Pseudomalachite has been reported from Argentina, Australia, Austria, Belgium, Brazil, Canada, Chile, Czech Republic, Democratic Republic of Congo, France, Germany, Ireland, Israel, Italy, Japan, Kazakhstan, Madagascar, Mexico, Namibia, Norway, Poland, Portugal, Republic of Congo, Romania, Russia, Slovakia, South Africa, Spain, UK, US and Zambia.

References 

Phosphate minerals
Copper(II) minerals
Monoclinic minerals
Minerals in space group 14